Matakido Dam is an earthfill dam located in Aomori Prefecture in Japan. The dam is used for flood control. The catchment area of the dam is 14.5 km2. The dam impounds about 13  ha of land when full and can store 1236 thousand cubic meters of water. The construction of the dam was started on 1968 and completed in 1988.

References

Dams in Aomori Prefecture
1988 establishments in Japan